Michel Grall (born September 11, 1961 in Carnac) is a French politician.  He was a member of the National Assembly of France.  He represented Morbihan's 2nd constituency from 2007 to 2012, as a member of the Union for a Popular Movement.

References

1961 births
Living people
People from Carnac
Union for a Popular Movement politicians
Deputies of the 13th National Assembly of the French Fifth Republic